Admiral K. Sangma (1956/1957 – 1 February 2020) was an Indian politician and member of the Nationalist Congress Party. Sangma was a member of the Meghalaya Legislative Assembly from the Dalamgiri constituency in West Garo Hills district as Indian National Congress candidate in 1993 and 1998.

References 

1950s births
2020 deaths
People from West Garo Hills district
Nationalist Congress Party politicians from Meghalaya
Indian National Congress politicians
Meghalaya MLAs 1988–1993
Meghalaya MLAs 1993–1998
Meghalaya MLAs 1998–2003
Meghalaya MLAs 2003–2008
Year of birth missing
Garo people